Grandiozny Peak is a mountain in Krasnoyarsk Krai, Russia. At  it is the highest summit in the Kryzhin Range, part of the Eastern Sayan, South Siberian System.

Description

See also
List of highest points of Russian federal subjects
List of mountains and hills of Russia
List of Ultras of Central Asia

References

External links
Пик Грандиозный 2014
The highest peaks in Russia
Highest points of Russian federal subjects
Mountains of Krasnoyarsk Krai
Sayan Mountains

ceb:Pik Grandioznyy